Alessandro Rontini (Florence, April 5, 1854 – 1933) was an Italian painter, mainly indoor (scena intime) genre paintings, depicting children and women.

He was a resident of Florence. His brother Augusto  and his son Ferrucio (1893-1964) were also painters. In 1880 at Florence, he displayed: Il paracadute; and at the Exhibition of Turin, Innocent Love. Other works include Amore ingenuo e the disturbatore and Scherzi materni. At 1886 in Livorno, he displayed: In giardino; Amore ingenuo, and Head of bambina. At the 1887 Exposition in Venice, he displayed Primavera.

References

1854 births
1933 deaths
19th-century Italian painters
Italian male painters
20th-century Italian painters
Italian genre painters
Painters from Florence
19th-century Italian male artists
20th-century Italian male artists